Joe Stilgoe (born 29 May 1979) is a British singer, pianist and songwriter.

Early life and education

Stilgoe was born in Sevenoaks, Kent. He is the son of the lyricist and entertainer Sir Richard Stilgoe, and opera singer Annabel Hunt.

Educated at Sevenoaks School, Stilgoe went on to study music at the University of Southampton achieving a First Class degree. After spending a year performing on cruise ships, Stilgoe continued his musicianship at Trinity College of Music.

Musical career

During his time at Trinity College, he began to get noticed in bars and clubs, with a long term residency at The Dorchester hotel, London.

Stilgoe's first public engagement was at the Pizza on the Park, London in 2004. Following the performance, Dame Cleo Laine later called Stilgoe in to perform with her and husband Sir John Dankworth on their Radio 2 show Live at the Stables. He then signed with jazz label Candid in 2007, Candid released his debut album I Like This One in 2008 to praise from national press.

In 2007, Stilgoe supported Melody Gardot at the Queen Elizabeth Hall. His debut solo appearance at Edinburgh Festival Fringe in 2011 with sell-out show 'One Hour!' received a five star review from The Scotsman.

After contractual issues with Candid, Stilgoe bought himself out of the contract and used money earned from his concerts to record demos of new songs. Nick Stewart then signed Stilgoe under his management with Nick Stewart and Associates in 2010.

With producer James McMillan, Stilgoe recorded a new album We Look to the Stars, released in July 2012. The album went to number 1 in the Amazon Jazz Chart on its day of release. From the album, We Should Kiss was released as a single in July 2012. The single was used by French shoe designer Christian Louboutin in his showcase –Fue at Le Crazy Horse in Paris and exhibition at the London Design Museum. In February 2014, Stilgoe released a live album Songs on Film, which includes songs from classic American films and Stilgoe's original compositions inspired by them. The album was commercially released by Linn Records on 17 November 2014, alongside his earlier albums. Stilgoe has participated in numerous recording sessions as both a pianist and singer; including the single "Elephant" by Alexandra Burke.

A publishing contract with Kassner Music was signed in 2012, and after a series of album releases, Stilgoe then transferred to The Music Sales Group in 2019. His album first album with the company, The Heat is On! - Swinging the 80s, a big band swing-inspired re-composition of 80s blockbuster themes is scheduled to be released in June 2019.

Comedy and radio

Stilgoe's radio work includes contributions and special guest appearances with Alan Carr, Sir Michael Parkinson and for Friday Night Is Music Night. Stilgoe also appeared on The Now Show in 2011 and 2013, was previously a member of BBC Radio 4's The Horne Section with Alex Horne, and hosts Joe Stilgoe & Friends at Ronnie Scott's, a gala featuring comedians, musicians, and performance acts.

Personal life

Stilgoe lives in west London with his wife, actress and director Katie Beard.

References

1979 births
Living people
Alumni of the University of Southampton
Alumni of Trinity College of Music
People from Sevenoaks
People educated at Sevenoaks School
British jazz singers
British jazz pianists
21st-century British singers
21st-century pianists